PlanGrid is a construction productivity software designed for onsite construction workers. PlanGrid digitises blueprints. It has features such as version control and collaboration tools such as field markups, progress photos and issues tracking.

PlanGrid is headquartered in San Francisco, California and was founded in 2011. It is available on mobile and windows devices. The software can store, view, and communicate construction blueprints.

PlanGrid's CEO, Tracy Young, was named to Fast Company's "Most Creative People in Business" in 2015.

The company's board of directors include former Salesforce COO George Hu, Sequoia Capital Partner Doug Leone, and former Autodesk CEO Carol Bartz.

Autodesk announced plans in November 2018 to acquire PlanGrid for US$875 million. The acquisition was completed on December 20, 2018.

Fundraising history

The company's seed-stage investors include Y-Combinator, Sam Altman, Paul Buchheit and 500 Startups.

In May 2015, PlanGrid raised a $18 million Series A from Sequoia Capital.

In November 2015, PlanGrid raised a $40 million Series B led by Tenaya Capital.

References

External links

Technology companies of the United States
Software companies based in California
Construction software
Construction documents
Autodesk acquisitions
2018 mergers and acquisitions
Defunct software companies of the United States
2012 establishments in California
Software companies established in 2012
American companies established in 2012